In mathematics, a non-Archimedean ordered field is an ordered field that does not satisfy the Archimedean property.  Examples are the Levi-Civita field, the hyperreal numbers, the surreal numbers, the Dehn field, and the field of rational functions with real coefficients with a suitable order.

Definition
The Archimedean property is a property of certain ordered fields such as the rational numbers or the real numbers, stating that every two elements are within an integer multiple of each other. If a field contains two positive elements  for which this is not true, then  must be an infinitesimal, greater than zero but smaller than any integer unit fraction. Therefore, the negation of the Archimedean property is equivalent to the existence of infinitesimals.

Applications
Hyperreal fields, non-Archimedean ordered fields containing the real numbers as a subfield, may be used to provide a mathematical foundation for nonstandard analysis.

The field of rational functions over  can be used to construct an ordered field which is complete (in the sense of convergence of Cauchy sequences) but is not the real numbers. Sometimes the term complete is used to mean that the least upper bound property holds. With this meaning of complete there are no complete non-Archimedean ordered fields. The subtle distinction between these two uses of the word complete is occasionally a source of confusion.

References

Ordered algebraic structures
Real algebraic geometry
Nonstandard analysis